Mark Day (born September 21, 1961) is an American former professional stock car racing driver, racing for a number of years in NASCAR's Busch and Southeast Series, as well as the ARCA Re/Max Series. In addition, his family used to own Day Enterprise Racing, which fielded entries in the Busch Series and ARCA Re/Max Series from 1989 to 2011.

Racing career

Craftsman Truck Series
Day only made one career start in NASCAR's Truck Series, which came at Nashville Speedway USA (now known as the Nashville Fairgounds Speedway) in the No. 50 R&Z Motorsports truck. He started 23rd, but only managed 31st in the 34-car field after mechanical issues.

Busch Series
Day made his debut in 1997, running five races for his family's 31-W Insulation team. He made his debut in the inaugural race at Texas, starting 37th. A mid-race wreck claimed his car and gave him a finish of 36th. It did not get much better for Day. He best finish on the year would end up being 31st at Talladega and had only a best start of 36th at Bristol. Simply put, it was not Day's dream season.

Day would scale down to one race for 1998 and for the rest of the years of his career, for that matter. He started 40th and finished 36th at Pikes Peak. He only competed fifty laps due to engine failure.

Day's one start in 1999 turned out to be just as poor. After starting 34th in the August Bristol race, Day managed 41st after a crash early in the event.

Another crash sideline Day in his 2000 start. He started 24th at Nashville, and this would turn out to be his best career start. He only finished 40th, however, due to a major late-race crash.

Day closed out his Busch career in 2001, finishing it with two consecutive starts. He did not finish either, but ironically, Day had his best career finish in that. After a 36th finish at Texas, Day was crashed out early of the inaugural event at Nashville Superspeedway. However, it turned up to be a 31st-place finish and his best career showing.

After an 8-year hiatus from NASCAR's second-tier division, Day returned to the now-NASCAR Nationwide Series for a one-race deal in October 2009 at Memphis Motorsports Park for the Kroger On Track For The Cure 250. This was the final NASCAR Nationwide race for the Memphis Motorsports Park after announcing that the track will cease operations at the end of the year. Driving for Wayne Day in the #05 31-W Insulation Chevy on a two-race deal. Day ended the 1st Practice Session 30th out of 50 cars entered. By the Final Practice Session Day was 19th out of the 48 cars left. Day easily made the show qualifying the #05 31-W Insulation Chevy solidly in the top 10 with a career high 9th place starting position. However the race did not end so high for Day. After 86 laps, Day pulled the #05 31-W Insulation Chevy into the garage due to overheating issues and he finished 33rd, but this could have been a start and park effort.

Late model racing
Day won the 2006 Late Model Championship, and several races in the Late Model Division at Music City Motorplex in Nashville, Tennessee. In conjunction with the Music City Motorplex (Fairgrounds Speedway) and its sponsor, Dollar General started Operation Big Chance during the 2006 race season for a chance to race in the NASCAR Craftsman Truck Series race in Martinsville, Virginia, in the #2 Kevin Harvick Incorporated (KHI) Chevy Silverado in the 2007 season. Day was the Dollar General Operation Big Chance winner after being the track champion with the most points at the end of the year between all late model and super truck series drivers. After being announced the Operation Big Chance winner, KHI offered Day a chance to qualify at Martinsville Truck Series race in 2007, but Day declined due to prior engagements with his late model series team. The next in line for the chance was second place Willie Allen but Allen had just signed to drive the #13 Chevy Silverado for ThorSport for the full 2007 NASCAR Craftsman Truck Series season. MCM and Dollar General finally announced Daniel Pope the Dollar General Operation Big Chance winner and made his debut at Mansfield Motorsports Park.
Day has since been a part of a Souther Superstar Series which travels around to a handful of tracks around the Southern United States. He has won 4 of the 5 championships that he has been eligible to win, and lost the 2014 Title because of a wreck he was involved in with 2 laps to go in a race where he would have clinched the Championship.

Controversy
In 2002, Day had a friend enter a car in a NASCAR-sanctioned late model race at Nashville Speedway USA for the sole purpose of finishing behind rival Deborah Renshaw so that he could file a protest (per NASCAR rules). Track promoter Dennis Glau had contacted NASCAR, who instructed him to disallow the protest. Her father and team owner Dan Renshaw, however, felt there was nothing to lose and allowed officials to search the engine. Unfortunately, a minor violation was found and her car was declared illegal. The protest was not only for Renshaw, but her male teammate Chevy White.

Motorsports career results

NASCAR
(key) (Bold – Pole position awarded by qualifying time. Italics – Pole position earned by points standings or practice time. * – Most laps led.)

Nationwide Series

Craftsman Truck Series

References

External links
 

1961 births
NASCAR drivers
American Speed Association drivers
Living people
People from Clarksville, Tennessee
Racing drivers from Tennessee